The 1981 Delaware Fightin' Blue Hens football team was an American football team that represented the University of Delaware as an independent during the 1981 NCAA Division I-AA football season. Delaware ended the regular season ranked No. 7 in the nation, but lost in the first round of the playoffs.

In their 16th year under head coach Tubby Raymond, the Hens compiled a 9–3 record (9–2 regular season). Ed Braceland was the team captain.

Starting the year on a three-game winning streak, the Hens were ranked No. 1 in the first two weeks of the weekly rankings. Though they dropped out of the top 10 in the middle of the year, a strong ending to the season saw them climb back to No. 7 in time to qualify for the eight-team playoff.

Delaware played its home games at Delaware Stadium on the university campus in Newark, Delaware.

Schedule

References

Delaware
Delaware Fightin' Blue Hens football seasons
Delaware Fightin' Blue Hens football